Fishbrook Pond is located south of Hullets Landing, New York. Fish species present in the lake are brook trout, rainbow trout, and brown bullhead. There is a trail from Pine Brook Road.

References

Lakes of New York (state)
Lakes of Washington County, New York